Paulus Petrus Gerardus "Paul" Boersma (born 15 November 1959, Sint Nicolaasga) is professor of phonetic sciences at the University of Amsterdam. His research and teaching focus on the relationship between phonology and phonetics. Together with David Weenink, he has developed the widely used speech signal processing program Praat, which has become widely used.

Since February 2022, Boersma has been the director of the Netherlands Graduate School of Linguistics (LOT).

References

External links
 Paul Boersma's home page
 Praat: Doing phonetics by computer

1959 births
Living people
Linguists from the Netherlands
Phoneticians
University of Amsterdam alumni
Academic staff of the University of Amsterdam
People from Skarsterlân